Teodoro Pio (died 1561) was a Roman Catholic prelate who served as Bishop of Faenza (1544–1561).

Biography
On 10 October 1544, Teodoro Pio was appointed during the papacy of Pope Paul III as Bishop of Faenza.
On 10 May 1545, he was consecrated bishop by Rodolfo Pio, Cardinal-Priest of Santa Maria in Trastevere, with Bernardino de Soria, Bishop of Venafro, and Filippo Bona, Bishop of Famagusta, serving as co-consecrators.
He served as Bishop of Faenza until his death in November 1561.

References

External links and additional sources
 (for Chronology of Bishops) 
 (for Chronology of Bishops)  

16th-century Italian Roman Catholic archbishops
Bishops appointed by Pope Paul III
1561 deaths